Philippine National Railways used to provide passenger services in two directions from the capital, thus serving various towns and cities north and south of Manila. This list contains stations of both Northrail and Southrail, and the various spur lines from both Northrail and Southrail, as well as stations within Metro Manila. The Northrail is also known as the Green Line, while the Southrail is also known as the Orange Line. Former termini or terminal stations are in bold and former or defunct stations are in italic.

North Main Line
Stations along the Manila-San Fernando Line were abandoned and closed. San Fernando-Dagupan closed in 1983, Dagupan-Tarlac in 1988 and Tarlac-Malolos in 1989. The eruption of Mount Pinatubo further shortened services up to Meycauayan in 1991 until it was closed in 1997.

Metro Manila

 — Tondo, Manila. Head office of the PNR. Former station building converted to a mall in the 1990s.
 — Tondo, Manila. Opened in 2018. To be rebuilt as part of the NSCR.
 — C-3 Road, Caloocan. Opened in 2018.
 — 10th Avenue, Caloocan. Opened in 2018.
 — Samson Road, Caloocan.
Kalookan — Sangandaan, Caloocan.
 — Malabon. Current northern terminus of the Metro North Commuter service.
Valenzuela NSCR — Malanday, Valenzuela. The station is being built beside the NSCR Phase 1 depot.
 — Dalandanan, Valenzuela. Formerly a flagstop named Polo, closed in 1997. Targeted to be the new northern terminus of the Metro North Commuter service.

Bulacan

The following stations were located in Bulacan with these closed between 1988 and 1991. A majority of these stations are being built under the North–South Commuter Railway (NSCR).

 — Meycauayan. Formerly Meycawayan. Being rebuilt under NSCR.
Imperial Textile Mills — Marilao. Meant to serve the Imperial Textile Mills plant, now Indo Phil. Closed in 1997.
 — Marilao. Being rebuilt under NSCR.
 — Bocaue. Being rebuilt under NSCR.
 — Balagtas. Being rebuilt under NSCR and proposed branching station for the Northeast Commuter Line to Cabanatuan.
Bigaa — Terminus of the Cabanatuan branch.
 — Guiguinto. Being rebuilt under NSCR.
Tabang — Guiguinto. Closed in 1991.
Santa Isabel — Malolos. Closed in 1991.
Dakila — Malolos. Closed in 1991.
 — Malolos. Northern end of the NSCR Phase 1.
San Marcos —  Calumpit. Opened as an infill station before 1949, closed in 1988.
Bagbag — Calumpit. Opened as part of the Bagbag–Mabalacat segment. Closed before 1949.
 – Calumpit. Being rebuilt under NSCR.

Pampanga

The following stations of the North Main Line are located in Pampanga. Services here were closed in 1988 with some of the stations being built for the NSCR North's Phase 2.

Calumpit Norte — Apalit. Temporary station during the 1890s. Mentioned in the 2020 book The Fireflies of Guiuan.
Sulipan — Apalit.
 — Apalit. Passenger flag stop and freight station. Being rebuilt under NSCR.
Macaluc — Minalin. Flagstop.
Santo Tomas — Santo Tomas.
 — San Fernando. Former terminus of the Metro Manila Commuter Service. Building preserved as a museum. New building being built under NSCR.
Calalut — San Fernando.
Tablante — San Fernando. Opened in 1924, closed before 1949.
 — Angeles City. Being rebuilt under NSCR.Balibago — Angeles. — Clark Special Economic Zone, Angeles. Under construction. — Clark SEZ, Mabalacat. Under construction. Located near the Mabalacat depot of NSCR Phase 2.Dau — Mabalacat. — Mabalacat.

Tarlac
The following are the stations located in Tarlac. Stations south of Tarlac City were closed in 1988 while stations to the north were closed in 1984. There are no stations here planned for reactivation, with New Clark City being the only new station to be built as part of the NSCR.Bamban — Bamban. — Capas. Northern terminus of the NSCR and southern terminus of two North Long Haul proposals.Capas — Capas. Also known as Santo Domingo. Contains a Bataan Death March historical marker.Murcia — Concepcion. Also known as San Agustin.San Miguel — Tarlac City.Tarlac City — Tarlac City.Dalayap — Tarlac City.Amacalan — Gerona.Parsolingan — Gerona.Paniqui — Paniqui.San Julian — Moncada.Moncada — Moncada.

PangasinanAlacan – Alacan, San FabianSapdaan – Sapdaan, San Fabian (Sapdaan)San Fabian – San Fabian (Terminus for the San Fabian-Camp One/San Fabian-Binday branch)Patalan – Patalan, San FabianMangaldan – MangaldanMaasin P. – Maasin, MangaldanDagupan – Mayombo, DagupanCalasiao – Calasiao (ruins)Buenlag – Buenlag, CalasiaoSan Carlos – San Carlos, PangasinanMalasiqui – MalasiquiPolong – Polong, Malasiqui (flag stop, opened in 1939)Don Pedro – Don Pedro, MalasiquiQuesada – Nalsian Norte, Malasiqui (now a basketball court)Bayambang (Bayambang Pasajeros) – BayambangBautista (Bayambang Mercancias) – Bautista (Originally as Bayambang Freight between 1892 and 1900).Poponto – Poponto, Bautista

 La Union Sudipen – Sudipen (The line was extended here during the Japanese Occupation)Quirino – Quirino, BacnotanMaragayap – Maragayap, BacnotanSanta Cruz – Santa Cruz, BacnotanBulala – Bulala, BacnotanBacnotan – Bacnotan (Terminus since 1955)Baroro – Baroro, BacnotanTaboc – Brgy., San JuanSan Juan – San Juan, La UnionBato – Bato, San JuanMameltac – Saoay, San FernandoBiday – Biday, San FernandoSan Fernando (San Fernando U) – San Fernando, La UnionRomas – Paringao, Bauang (opened in 1931)Bauang – BauangCalumbaya (Bauang Sur) – Calumbaya, BauangSantiago – Santiago, BauangUrayong – Urayong, BauangCaba (Cava) – CabaAringay – Aringay [Terminus for the Aringay-Baguio Line]South Aringay – Aringay (Temporary station during the construction of the Aringay Bridge)Paraton – San Eugenio, AringayAgoo – AgooSanto Tomas (Santo Tomas U) – Santo TomasCupang –  Cupang, Santo TomasOld Damortis – Damortis, Rosario (Original Damortis Sta.)Damortis – Damortis, Rosario [terminus for car/bus shuttle service to Baguio via Kennon Road]Bani – Bani, Rosario (opened in 1926)Rabon – Rabon, Rosario

 East West Line (rapid transit) 

The PNR East West line, or MRT Line 8, is a proposed rapid transit line in Metro Manila in the Philippines, generally running in an east–west direction along the Radial Road 7 and a portion of the Radial Road 8.

The line serves 11 stations on 9.4 kilometers (5.8 mi) of line. The rails are mostly elevated and erected either over or along the roads covered, with sections below ground. The western terminus of the line is the Quiapo station infont of Quiapo Church, while the eastern terminus of the line is the Diliman station along Commonwealth Avenue in Barangay Old Capitol Site, Quezon City.

Metro ManilaDiliman – Quezon CityEDSA – Quezon CityTimog – Quezon CityRoces – Quezon CityAraneta – Quezon CityBanaue – Quezon CityWelcome – Quezon CityAntipolo – ManilaUST – Manila Lerma – ManilaQuiapo – Manila

South Main Line (Southrail)

 Metro Manila 

Tutuban (Manila/Tondo) – Tondo, Manila (north terminus of the PNR Metro Commuter Line)Tayuman – Tayuman Street, Tondo, Manila (defunct, former terminus when Tutuban was converted into a mall)
Blumentritt (San Lazaro/Santa Cruz) – Sampaloc, Manila
Laong-Laan (Dapitan) – Sampaloc, Manila
España – Sampaloc, ManilaLegarda – Sampaloc, Manila (defunct flag stop)Sampaloc – Sampaloc, Manila (defunct)
Santa Mesa – Santa Mesa, Manila (beside Polytechnic University of the Philippines)
Pandacan (Beata) – Pandacan, Manila
Paco – Paco, Manila
San Andres – San Andres, Manila
Vito Cruz – San Andres, ManilaBuendia – Pio del Pilar, Makati (closed, replaced by Dela Rosa station)
Dela Rosa – Pio del Pilar, Makati
Pasay Road (Culi-culi/Pio del Pilar) – Pio del Pilar, Makati
EDSA – Bangkal, Makati
Nichols (Bonifacio-Villamor) – Western Bicutan, TaguigBalagbag – Balagbag, Pasay (defunct, replaced by FTI)
FTI – (Food Terminal Junction/Arca South) Western Bicutan, TaguigPhilippine-American Embroidery (Gelmart) – San Martin de Porres, Parañaque (defunct, replaced by Bicutan)
Bicutan – San Martin de Porres, ParañaqueBagumbayan – Bagumbayan, Taguig (defunct flag stop)Batisan – Bagumbayan, Taguig (defunct flag stop)
Sucat – Sucat, MuntinlupaBuli (Cupang) – Cupang, Muntinlupa (defunct)
Alabang – Alabang, Muntinlupa (south terminus of the PNR Metro Commuter Line)
Muntinlupa – Poblacion, Muntinlupa Tunasan – Tunasan, Muntinlupa [flag stop] (defunct)

Laguna

San Pedro (San Pedro Tunasan) – San Vicente, San Pedro   (Terminus for the defunct San Pedro-Carmona branch line)
Pacita Complex – Pacita Complex, San Pedro
Golden City 1 – Golden City Subdivision, Biñan
Biñan – Biñan
Santa Rosa – Labas, City Proper, Santa RosaGolden City 2 station – Golden City Subdivision, Santa Rosa
Cabuyao – near Asia Brewery, Inc. Manufacturing Plant, Cabuyao
Mamatid – Mamatid, Cabuyao (Terminus for the Mamatid-Canlubang Line)Banlic – Banlic, Calamba 
Calamba – 1, Calamba (Terminus for the Calamba-Batangas branch line)Bucal – Bucal, Calamba (removed in 1916)
Pansol – Pansol, Calamba
Masili railway station – Masili, Calamba (flag stop)
Los Baños – Bambang, Los Baños
UP Los Baños (Junction/College) – University of the Philippines, Batong Malake, Los Baños (Terminus for the UP Los Baños-Santa Cruz branch line)
IRRI – International Rice Research Institute, University of the Philippines, Batong Malake, Los BañosMasaya – Masaya, BaySan Crispin – San Crispin, San Pablo (ruins)
San Pablo – San PabloMcCord – San Miguel, San Pablo (defunct)Santa Ana – Santa Ana, San Pablo (defunct)

Quezon

Tiaong (Tiaon) – TiaongLusacan – Lusacan, Tiaong
Candelaria – CandelariaConcepcion – Concepcion, Sariaya (flag stop)
Lutucan – Barangay Lutucan, Sariaya
Sariaya (Bucal) – Bucal, SariayaMorong – Morong, Sariaya
Lucena – South City Proper, LucenaMayao – Mayao, Lucena (defunct flag stop)Castillo – Castillo, PagbilaoPagbilao – PagbilaoPinagbayanan – Pinagbayanan, PagbilaoPalsabangon  – Ibabang Palsabangon, Pagbilao( flagstop)Binahaan – Binahaan, PagbilaoMalicboy – Malicboy, PagbilaoGuintong – Guinto, PagbilaoSipa – Sipa, PagbilaoHinguiwin – Hinguiwin, Padre BurgosPadre Burgos (Laguimanoc) – Padre BurgosMarao – Marao, Padre BurgosPinaninding – Danlagan, Padre BurgosSan Isidro (Yawe) – San Isidro, Padre BurgosWalay – Walay, Padre BurgosCabuyao – Cabuyao Sur, Padre Burgos (flag stop)Agdangan – AgdanganPanaon – Panaon, UnisanPoctol – Poctol, UnisanAtimonan (Summit) – Inalig, AtimonanPlaridel (Siain) – PlaridelInaclagan – Inaclagan, GumacaVilla Bota – Villa Bota, GumacaGumaca – GumacaPanikihan – Panikihan, GumacaBamban – Bamban, GumacaHagakhakin – Hagakhakin, GumacaSan Vicente – San Vicente, GumacaPansol – Pansol, Lopez, (defunct flag stop, opened in 1923)Lopez – LopezSanta Lucia – Santa Lucia, LopezHondagua – Hondagua, LopezCalauag – Santa Maria, CalauagSumulong – Sumulong, CalauagSanto Domingo – Santo Domingo, CalauagDanlagan – Danlagan Reserva, Guinayangan (destroyed in 1945)Aloneros – Aloneros, GuinayanganCabugwang – Cabugwang, TagkawayanManato – Manato station, TagkawayanNew Aloneros – Manato station, TagkawayanMangayao – Mangayao, TagkawayanKatimo – Katimo, TagkawayanBuyabod – Buyabod, TagkawayanKinatakutan – Kinatakutan, TagkawayanLaurel – Laurel, TagkawayanAliji – Aliji, TagkawayanMorato – Morato, TagkawayanTagkawayan – Tagkawayan

Camarines SurPasay (Pasay C.S.) – Pasay, Del GallegoDel Gallego – Del GallegoSan Juan – San Juan, Del GallegoSinuknipan – Sinuknipan, Del GallegoCatabangan (Godofredo Reyes Sr.) – Godofredo Reyes Sr. (Catabangan Junction), RagayPort Junction – Port Junction, RagayFort Simeon (Pugod) – Fort Simeon, RagayLiboro – Liboro, RagayRagay – RagayBanga Caves – Banga Caves, RagayDel Rosario – Colacling (Del Rosario), Lupi (flag stop)Lupi Viejo – Lupi (flag stop)Lupi Nuevo – Tapi, LupiManangle – Manangle, Sipocot
Sipocot – Sipocot
Awayan – Awayan, Sipocot (flag stop)
Mantalisay – Mantalisay, Libmanan (flag stop)
Camambugan – Camambugan, Libmanan (flag stop)
Libmanan – Libmanan
Rongos – Rongos, Libmanan [flag stop]
Malansad – Malansad, Libmanan [flag stop]
Mambulo – Mambulo Viejo, Libmanan (flag stop)
Pamplona – Pamplona
Burabod – Burabod, Pamplona (flag stop)
Sampaloc – Sampaloc, Gainza (flag stop)
Naga – Triangulo, Naga, Camarines SurSan Antonio (San Antonio C.S.) – San Antonio, MilaorMaycatmon – Maycatmon, MilaorSan Jose – San Jose, Pili
Pili – PiliBula – BulaAgdangan – Agdangan, BaaoBaao – Baao
Iriga – Iriga
Lourdes Old – Lourdes Old, Nabua (flag stop)Bato – Bato

AlbayMatacon – Matacon, Polangui (flag stop)Santicon – Santicon, PolanguiApad – Apad, Polangui
Polangui – Polangui
Oas – Oas (flag stop)
Ligao – LigaoGuinobatan – Masarawag, Guinobatan
Travesia – Travesia, GuinobatanCamalig – Camalig [Abandoned because of a diversion line built by the PNR to alleviate the original high gradient, lava affected section between Camalig and Daraga]
Daraga – Sagpon, Daraga
Washington Drive – 16 Kawit-East Washington Drive, Legazpi (flagstop)
Legazpi (Legaspi) – Legazpi (Terminus for the Legazpi-Tabaco Line)

Abandoned and inactive branches

Abandoned

Tarlac-San Jose branch
An abandoned branch line serving Tarlac and Nueva Ecija. This line was also planned to be extended to Cagayan province, with services linking almost all the provinces in the Cagayan Valley. PNR has requested for a feasibility study for the revival of the line, to be connected to the North-South Commuter Railway project.

TarlacTarlac City – Tarlac CityBalibago T. – Balibago, Tarlac (flag stop)Victoria – Victoria (ruins)Canarem – Canarem, Victoria (flag stop)

Nueva EcijaSubol – Subol, GuimbaBantug – Bantug, GuimbaGuimba – Guimba (ruins)Matarano – Maturanoc, GumimbaCabaruan – Cabaruan, GuimbaGabaldon – Gabaldon, MuñozPalosapis – Palusapis, MuñozMuñoz (Muñoz-Talavera) – MuñozCentral Luzon Agricultural College – Central Luzon State University, MuñozSan Jose – San Jose (ruins)

IsabelaCordon – CordonSantiago – SantiagoEchague (proposed) – Echague (original terminus planned in 1946; line extended to Tuguegarao)

CagayanEnrile – EnrileTuguegarao (proposed) – Tuguegarao

Santa Mesa-Antipolo branch

Ceased operations when the San Juan River Bridge collapsed. Remains of the old railroad tracks from the old line are still present. The piers of the San Juan River bridge were still standing until they were demolished in 2018 due to the Skyway Stage 3 traversing through the river. It would be only feasible in the future to reactive just the Sta. Mesa-Mandaluyong parts of the line and the bridge rebuilt, with possible elevated tracks on the final segment to the Guadalupe station, which links the PNR to EDSA and MRT Line 3 (the nearest stations are the Guadalupe Station in Makati and Boni Avenue Station in Mandaluyong).

ManilaSanta Mesa – Bacood, Santa MesaCordillera – Bacood, Santa Mesa (flag stop, opened in 1974)Bagumbayan – Bacood, Santa Mesa (flag stop, opened in 1974)

MandaluyongMandaluyong (San Felipe Neri) – Daang BakalMagalona – Daang Bakal (flag stop, opened in 1974)A. Bonifacio – Addition Hills (flag stop, opened in 1974)Welfareville – Addition HillsBoni Avenue – Old Zañiga (flag stop, opened in 1974)Zaniga (Saniga) – Old Zañiga (flag stop, opened in 1974)Hulo (San Pedro Macati) – Hulo, near San Francisco Street (flag stop)Guadalupe (Barangka) – Barangka Ilaya, near EDSA, terminus of the line

PasigFort McKinley – Kapitolyo Pineda – Pineda, near Barangay Hall (flag stop, opened in 1927)Bagong Ilog – Bagong Ilog (flag stop, opened in 1928)Pasig – PasigRosario – Rosario (terminus for the Rosario-Montalban line)

RizalCainta – Cainta (opened in 1925)Taytay – Taytay (rail yard now serves as a market)Hinulugang Taktak – Hinulugang Taktak, AntipoloAntipolo – Antipolo (corner of Sumulong Memorial Circle and San Jose St.)

Balagtas-Cabanatuan branch
This line is one of the branch lines that were abandoned after World War II. The line was reopened in 1969; however, it was once again left non-operational in 1980. If reactivated, it will serve thousands of people and tourists as well as provide freight services to the provinces of Bulacan and Nueva Ecija. PNR has requested a feasibility study for a planned revival as a northeast commuter line to Makati, as part of the process for getting the final nod on the project.

BulacanBalagtas (Bigaa) – BalagtasMalis – Malis, Guiguinto (also known as Tiaong G.)Plaridel (Quingua) – PlaridelBaliuag – BaliuagMaasim – Maasim, San IldefonsoSan Ildefonso – San IldefonsoSan Miguel (San Miguel de Mayumo) – San MiguelPinambaran – Pinambaran, San Miguel

Nueva EcijaBaluarte – Baluarte, GapanSan Isidro – San IsidroGapan – GapanPeñaranda – PeñarandaPapaya – General TinioSan Leonardo – San LeonardoSanta Rosa – Santa RosaCabanatuan – Cabanatuan

Rosario-Montalban branch
An abandoned branch line which used to serve the cities of Pasig, Marikina, and the province of Rizal.

PasigRosario – Rosario

MarikinaMarikina (Mariquina) – Marikina (still existing)Santo Niño – Santo Niño (flag stop, opened in 1927)Bayanbayanan – BayanbayananNangka – Nangka (flag stop, opened in 1927)

RizalSan Mateo – San MateoBurgos – Burgos, Rodriguez (opened in 1928)Montalban – Balite, Rodriguez (now serves as a basketball court, at the back of the Our Lady of the Most Holy Rosary Parish)

Fort Stotsenburg-Dau branch
A line from Fort Stotsenburg in Angeles to Mabalacat, PampangaStotsenburg – Sapangbato, Angeles CityMargot – Margot, Angeles (opened in 1927)Dau – Dau, Mabalacat

Dau-Magalang branch
An abandoned branch line from Dau to Magalang.Dau – Dau, Mabalacat, PampangaSapang Biabas  – Sapang Biabas, MabalacatBical – Bical, MabalacatMagalang – San Pedro II, Magalang (still existing)

Nielson Field branch
Abandoned after Nielson Field was closed.Culi-culi – Pio del Pilar, Makati

Legazpi-Tabaco branch
Abandoned line that served passengers and cargo going to Tabaco and its harbor.Legazpi – Legazpi, AlbaySanto Domingo (Libog) – Santo Domingo, AlbayBacacay – Bacacay, AlbayMalilipot – Malilipot, AlbayTabaco – Tabaco, Albay

Aringay–Asin branch
This was a  spur line meant to connect Aringay, La Union with Baguio. However, tracks actually terminated in Asin in Tuba, Benguet. Construction on the final section leading to Baguio was halted during World War I. The Salapak Tunnel, originally meant for the line, was used during World War II as the regional headquarters of the Imperial Japanese Army. During the PNR era, the right-of-way has been sold to residents and became either roads or farmland. The local government of Aringay also proposed to the PNR to convert the Salapak Tunnel into an ecotourism zone, but PNR turned down the request since there are plans to restore the tunnel in the future, referring to the PNR North Long Haul service.Aringay – Aringay, La UnionAsin – Tuba, Benguet (completed section)Baguio – Baguio (proposed)

San Fabian-Camp One branch
This is a line to Camp One, Rosario, La Union. It was the first railroad project attempting to reach Baguio, abandoned however in 1914. A remnant is the triangle junction which was part of the rail tracks, which are now being used as roads.San Fabian – San Fabian, PangasinanBinday – Binday, San FabianAlava – Alava, San FabianCamp One – Camp One, Rosario, La Union

Arayat-Carmen branch
If reactivated, it would serve as a tourist line linking the PNR network to the Mount Arayat National Park and as a faster access to western parts of Pampanga, northern Bataan, southern Zambales and the Subic Bay Freeport Zone, with the possible construction in the future of a rail line linking the two economic zones, which would entail the building of a connector branch to link said line to the PNR system.Arayat – Arayat, PampangaSta. Ana – Sta. Ana, Mexico, PampangaMexico – MexicoSan Fernando – San Fernando, PampangaPasudeco – Santo Niño, San FernandoBacolor – Bacolor, PampangaCabetican – Cabetican, BacolorBetis – Betis, GuaguaGuagua – Guagua, PampangaSanta Monica – Santa Monica, LubaoLubao – Lubao, PampangaSan Matias – San Matias, LubaoConcepcion – Concepcion, LubaoSan Francisco – San Francisco, LubaoFloridablanca – Floridablanca, PampangaPaguiruan – Paguiruan, FloridablancaDel Carmen (Carmen) – Del Carmen, Floridablanca

Tayug branch
If reactivated, the line will serve residents and freight in Pangasinan, Nueva Ecija, and Tarlac, as well as help draw tourists to these provinces.

TarlacPaniqui – Paniqui

Nueva EcijaNampicuan – NampicuanCuyapo – CuyapoBued – Bued, Cuyapo

PangasinanCalanatuan – Calanutan, RosalesRosales – RosalesBalungao – BalungaoSan Leon – San Leon, BalungaoCabalitian – Cabalitian, UminganSan Pedro – San Pedro, San Quintin (flag stop, still existing)San Quintin – San Quintin

San Pablo-Malvar branch
Branch line from San Pablo, Laguna to Malvar, Batangas. It was abandoned after the Los Baños to San Pablo route was built. If reopened, it would serve as an alternative to the main line.San Pablo – San PabloSanta Monica – Santa Monica, San PabloMagampon – San PabloAlaminos – Alaminos, LagunaSan Andres – San Andres, AlaminosSan Joaquin – San Joaquin, Santo TomasCamballao – San Francisco, Santo Tomas (opened in 1928)Salvarrol – San Francisco, Santo TomasMalvar (Luta) – Malvar, Batangas

Paniqui-Camiling branch
Abandoned tram line that was operated by the Tarlac Railway Company.Paniqui – PaniquiPresidencia – Cayanga, PaniquiCabayaoasan – Cabayaoasan, PaniquiTarlac River – Rang-Ayan, PaniquiBarang – Barang, PaniquiMatubog – Matubog, CamilingCamiling – Camiling

Lingayen-Camiling branch
Cancelled during the planning stages. The route was supposed to be from Lingayen, Pangasinan to Camiling, Tarlac.

Damortis-Tuba branch
Branch line abandoned before the bed was completed and before any bridges had been constructed, the only remains of this line are the two railroad tunnels in Asin Road.Damortis – Damortis, Rosario, La UnionTuba (proposed) – Tuba, Benguet

Caba-Galiano branch
Abandoned before the bed was completed and before any bridges had been constructedCaba (proposed) – CabaKapangan (proposed) – Kapangan, BenguetLa Trinidad (proposed) – La Trinidad, BenguetGaliano (proposed) – Atok, Benguet

Paco-Naic branch
Very few, if not none, of the original line exists today due to the path occupied presently by Ninoy Aquino International Airport and various developments since the line's closure.Paco – Paco, ManilaSingalong – 730 Zone 79, Vito Cruz St., Malate, ManilaPasay – 64 Zone 8 Pasay [near the Santa Clara de Montefalco church]Maricaban (Tabon) – Maricaban, PasayPildera – Airport Rd. Parañaque (the closest station to NAIA)Parañaque – San Dionisio. ParañaqueLas Piñas – Manuyo Uno, Las PiñasAromahan – Pamplona Uno, Las PiñasZapote – Zapote IV, Bacoor, CavitePanapaan – Panapaan III, BacoorBacoor –  Poblacion, Bacoor, CaviteBinacayan – Binacayan, Kawit, CaviteGahak – Gahak, KawitCavite El Viejo – Kawit, Cavite [formerly Cavite El Viejo]San Juan – San Juan, NoveletaNoveleta – Noveleta, CaviteSalinas (Rosario) – Rosario, CaviteTanza – Tanza, CaviteNaic – Ibayong Estacion, Naic, Cavite

San Pedro-Carmona branch
This is the last branch line that was used by PNR up to early 2000s. In 2010, the land area of the station in San Jose (now considered on the tip and under the jurisdiction of GMA Cavite between San Pedro and Carmona), was allegedly re-leased to the private sector and the old rails were dismantled halfway up to Olympia Street in Pacita Complex. The old rails still exists from Chrysanthemum Station up to Crismor Ave. in Elvinda near the old San Pedro Station and is at least still in use by the squatter's trolleys. This  line was opened in 1973.

Though inactive at present, PNR plans to reintroduce services to this branch line.

LagunaSan Pedro – San Vicente, San PedroChrysanthemum Village – San Pedro
Carmona – Magsaysay, San Pedro

Cavite branch
An abandoned branch line serving Cavite City and parts of Noveleta.Caridad – Caridad, Cavite CitySan Roque – San Roque, Cavite CityCavite  – Cavite City

Pandacan-Isla Provisor branch
Also known as the Santibañez line. This line had spurs leading to Isla Provisor, Luzon Brokerage Company, the closed Pandacan Oil Depot and the Johnson Picket Rope Company. It ends in what is now the Tabacalera Compound today. The bridge route's crossing in Pasig River is a mechanical swing bridge built to allow bigger ships to pass through. Today, not only is the mechanical component of the bridge nonfunctional, but the bridge itself cannot turn anymore due to the Pandacan Bridge built very close to its turning radius. The very bridge itself is still in use by trains, and occasionally by rickshaws and railskates. It is planned to be rebuilt as part of the NSCR South and the modernized Long Haul project.
Pandacan (Beata) – Pandacan, ManilaSantibañez – Paco, Manila

Rongos branch
A 1.7-kilometer line connecting the former Rongos wharf in the Bicol River for construction purposes. Dismantled after the completion of the South Line in 1938.
Rongos – Rongos, Libmanan [flag stop]Rongos Wharf – Rongos, Libmanan

 Inactive 

UP Los Baños-Santa Cruz branch
This inactive line, when reactivated, could serve passengers and freight in the eastern towns of Laguna, while providing a faster access to tourist and historical destinations within the province.

LagunaCollege – Batong Malake, Los BañosBay – BayBangyas – Bangyas, CalauanVictoria (Dayap) – VictoriaManaol – Manaol, NagcarlanBanca-Banca – Banca-Banca, NagcarlanCalumpang – Calumpang, NagcarlanMagdalena – MagdalenaCabanbanan (Buboy) – Pagsawitan, Santa CruzPagsawitan – Pagsawitan, Santa CruzSanta Cruz – near the Laguna Provincial Capitol, Santa Cruz Pagsanjan – Maulawin, Pagsanjan

Calamba-Bauan branch
Part of the Long-Haul Railway project, it includes the construction of a new line to Bicol. The Calamba-Batangas City section of the branch will be reconstructed into a new single-track line that will be expanded to two when capacity is needed to be expanded.

LagunaCalamba – 1, CalambaMakiling – Makiling, Calamba

BatangasSanto Tomas – Santo TomasTanauan – TanauanMalvar (Luta) – Poblacion, Malvar, Batangas [Terminus for the San Pablo-Malvar Line]Lipa – LipaSan Jose – San JoseBatangas – near the Batangas Provincial CapitolBauan – Bauan

Mamatid-Buntog branch
This branch line, currently inactive, is the nearest rail link to the Nuvali residential township of Ayala Land, which extends to Calamba to the south, as well as to Tagaytay. It is also a potential branch line for a revived freight service from Metro Manila in the future, since a multimodal freight terminal was from the 1990s up to 2001 served by this line via container trains from the capital region.Mamatid – Mamatid, CabuyaoMajapa – Majapa, Calamba, LagunaCanlubang – Canlubang, CalambaLocomotive – Canlubang, CalambaBuntog'' – Sitio Buntog, Canlubang, Calamba

Cabuyao branch
The only remnant of this line is a railroad overpass crossing the South Luzon Expressway near Eton City Exit, claimed to be part of Cabuyao. The branch, if active, could have linked Eton City and the urban townships of Santa Rosa to the PNR system, as well as provide freight connections to the nearby industrial complexes and as a faster alternative to the Cavite-Laguna Expressway.

See also 
 Philippine National Railways

References 

Philippine National Railways stations
Railway stations in the Philippines
Philippines
Rail
Railway stations